The Hulme Hippodrome in Manchester, England, is a Grade 2 listed building, a proscenium arch theatre with two galleries and a side hall. It was originally known as the Grand Junction Theatre and Floral Hall, and opened on 7 October 1901 on the former main road of Preston Street, Hulme.  It was also used for repertory theatre in 1940s, and for recording BBC programmes with audiences between 1950 and 1956. The theatre has been closed since 2018 and a campaign group exists to bring it back into use as a community resource. The stage doors are on Warwick Street. Its local name in memoirs and records is 'The Hipp'.

Architectural details 
The two venues were reportedly connected by an arcade (some researchers question this feature existed). The extensive building was Broadhead's company headquarters. Various architectural drawings for the building exist in archives, not all of which correspond with the eventual constructed form of the building. The architect was Joseph John Alley (1841–1912), however W.H. Broadhead had previously made his money as a builder and is suggested in research to have had a strong influence in the design and construction. The rectangular shape of the auditorium and the seating arranged in straight lines were distinctive to the Broadhead-built theatres. The frontage includes ornamentation with white glazed-brick bandings and pilaster strips, with (now faded) painted lettering. The motto of the Broadhead circuit was, Quick, Clean, Smart and Bright.

Location and 1960s road changes 
The Hulme Hippodrome frontage originally faced onto a road, Preston Street, and it was facing a T-junction with the southern end of Clopton Street, a main road that headed north towards the city centre (Ellis Street follows it part-way now). Outside the frontage of Hulme Hippodrome are footpaths that meet in a small square where Preston Street and Clopton Street were sited previously. The roads were removed ('stopped up') in the 1960s urban regeneration, around 1965. Following this phase, Clopton Street became Clopton Walk, a footpath going north towards the new Hulme Crescents. In the 1990s urban regeneration phase the Crescents and that pathway were demolished and removed. 

Up to the 1960s the theatre was served by trams then buses, including the 62 bus route from Heaton Park via Albert Square to Chorlton, and people from north Manchester would reportedly regularly attend the performances, including children from Prestwich travelling independently by the direct bus. 

Currently the Hipp has theatre doors on a remaining eastern boundary road of Warwick Street, M15 5EU. Some of the older postcodes used for the building are no longer officially recognised, for example M15 5JJ.

Main auditorium 
The main auditorium is a proscenium arch theatre with two galleries - named as The Circle and with The Balcony above. The ornate interior plasterwork was by Messrs Alberti, of Oxford Street, Manchester. The initial seating capacity was 3,300 (the most recent figure is 1,350) and unusually for a theatre the audience originally sat on straight benches, except for seven rows of individual tip-up seats in the centre block of the Circle. Benches were preferred by some theatre managers to squeeze in extra paying patrons for the popular shows. Gradually in later years more individual seats were installed in phases to replace the benches. The theatre's three-storey fly-tower is at the east side elevation next to Warwick Street with the backstage doors. Some additional doorways were reportedly added to this elevation around the 1960s to provide additional safety exits. This side also includes a square chimney with white glazed-brick decoration.

A detail from a memoir of Mary Jordan, a woman who lived all her life in Hulme notes that some exit routes were ramps and not stairs, possibly from the Circle. 

 "One evening [my husband] Bill and I took our Brian and my nephew Brian to the Hulme Hippodrome. How they enjoyed it! On coming out, my nephew Brian, running as usual, was in front of us. When you came out of the Hippodrome, you came down a long ramp to the street, made up from wooden boards which ran crosswise. Running down the slope, Brian gathered speed. Suddenly he decided to look back, probably to see where we were and in doing so he caught the toe of his shoe between the boards. Down he went, face first! By the time we had reached him somebody had already picked him up." This was around 1944.

Floral Hall 
The Floral Hall was originally a full-height Edwardian atrium with a glass apex roof for patrons to promenade indoors while waiting for the auditorium doors to open. The "early doors" system allowed patrons who paid an extra amount, advertised as a booked seat, to enter the building first and congregate, thus having access to the better seats before the standard-price patrons were admitted behind them. Over the years the atrium has been extensively modified, including division at first floor height with additional floors and ceilings, probably in the 1970s, but with its original 1901 features reportedly retained behind the later fixtures. The glass apex roofing was replaced with corrugated sheets.

Frontage and shops 
From archived plans, the original frontage was mostly shops with a small area to the north-west corner having an entrance to the theatre and a box office window to the street. In later years a shop in the central area was removed to create a more prominent theatre entrance. The four (possibly five, or six according to one drawing) small shops on Preston Street, odd numbers 47 to 53, were along the front of the building up to the north-east corner. Each shop unit had their own stairway to a self-contained basement. Known uses from oral histories and photographs include a shoe repairer, a hairdresser, and a tobacconist. The shop frontages were rendered over in 1971 and the units were reconfigured for use as storage areas with access via internal doorways. 

The footprint is 1685 square metres (18,135 square feet); two and three storeys (10.2m height) plus a basement. The whole building (both theatres) is 2506 square metres (26,975 square feet). The size of the building means that during heavy rain (8mm/hr) 20,000 litres of water (4,300 gallons) needs to be channelled and drained off the roof space per hour.

A mercury arc rectifier made by Slatter & Co of London survives in the basement. These were typically used in commercial buildings that originally had a supply of DC (direct current) electricity to their plant equipment, because when the local mains supply was converted to AC (alternating current) people could continue to use their older DC equipment. It was cheaper to buy a rectifier than to replace the DC plant equipment. The switch from DC to AC mains was mostly in the early 1900s.

1905 name swap – Variety starts 
Initially the larger of the two conjoined theatres staged mainly dramatic productions, while the smaller theatre presented variety performances, but due to the increasing popularity of variety theatre the names and functions of the two adjacent theatres were swapped over in 1905: the formerly-named Hippodrome became known as the Grand Junction, and the variety performances and name were transferred to the larger theatre, now the new Hippodrome. The 1905 swap also replaced some benches in the Pit and Stalls areas with individual tip-up seats, the most expensive seats, prices ranging from tuppence (1p) to nine pence (4p).

The roots of variety theatre in the UK have been said in some research to be found in the vaudeville format that came from the USA. It extended the previous UK format of music halls, with the audience around tables with food and drink. Many researchers use 'music hall' in a broader way without the seating format being the main factor, and this includes the origins and early years of Hulme Hippodrome.

Overcrowding 
From a press report, on 20 February 1908 the Watch Committee of Manchester Corporation met in the Lord Mayor's Parlour in Manchester Town Hall in public to approve theatre licences and to hear complaints about overcrowding in theatres. WH Broadhead was in attendance asking for a licence concession to sell alcohol at Hulme Hippodrome and his other theatres. The packed public attendance had raised petitions and were complaining strongly about 'the queueing system' and instead they wanted 'the booking system'. One theatre (Prince's Theatre, Manchester) had 700 people reported as standing in the Pit area at times, along with blocked exit routes. The queueing system included what was known at the time as the "early doors" process which gave people a choice of the better seats in return for both paying higher prices and arriving early, and "late doors" referred to the cheaper prices for people who were let in later to take the remainder of the seats. However, people who had paid the early doors prices were complaining about having to wait for hours in bad weather and shopkeepers were complaining about so many people blocking 'their' pavements. For example, at the meeting "A young lady said she waited outside the [Prince's] theatre one evening for an hour and a quarter, paid a shilling, and then found there was no room." The theatre owners present at the meeting successfully resisted a change to having to adopt the booking system, but in return the committee's decision was that for "the music-halls, the Broadhead theatres, and the Gaiety Theatre the Committee again exacted a covenant from the [licence] applicants that they would not sell intoxicating liquors." This ban on alcohol sales remained until February 1935.

A 'number two' venue 
Variety theatres in Britain were divided into a hierarchy of three national networks with the top being called ‘number one’. This hierarchy collapsed in the mid-1950s "with remarkable speed.” Artists were paid the most by number one venues, such as on the Moss Empires Theatres circuit, and once they started to get such bookings they would refuse booking requests from venues lower in the hierarchy. Number one venues were mostly in the West End theatre district in London and in some other city centres. Examples of a number one venue were the (First) Manchester Hippodrome on Oxford Road, and the Ardwick Empire (later the New Manchester Hippodrome) in Ardwick Green. Hulme Hippodrome was a number two venue (based on recollections of older people from Hulme who visited as children, knowing it was called a "second grade" variety theatre; and press comments). 

Number three venues tended to be local independents or in the smaller circuits. Number one venues had larger orchestras, and with a wider range of musicians. A benefit of being designated as a lower number venue was that their audiences would often be the first to see new artists. Having all three types of ‘number’ theatres nearby added to the range of acts available to local communities, like having a choice of different TV channels. Audiences could also be set in their ways. In 1947 the Bristol Empire theatre, noted as a 'number two' theatre for its variety and revue shows, ran an experiment of showing eight plays. However the chronicler of the theatre reported that the working-class audiences stayed away and the middle-class audiences wouldn't come away from 'their' own theatres.

Early artists at the Hip 
Research has been done into some of the notable black performers who appeared at Hulme Hippodrome in the variety era, including Harry Scott and Eddie Whaley, Cassie Walmer, Will Garland, Chris Gill, and Ike Hatch. 

In November 1906 Hulme Hippodrome was a venue for a wrestling match, and a press report indicates the disorder that followed:

 Last night J Carroll, the British champion light-weight wrestler, met the German champion Peter Gotz, who offered £25 to any Englishman who was not thrown in thirty minutes. The scene was the Hulme Hippodrome, which was crowded. The conditions included the offer that if a throw were obtained against the German the money would be paid over. The contestants were on the mat for 22 minutes. The Englishman after three minutes had Gotz in difficulties, and almost gained the victory. The German recovered, and it was a hard and earnest struggle to the end, which was not at all satisfactory to the audience. Carroll was several times near throwing his opponent. Suddenly Gotz, with a leg hold, summersaulted Carroll, who appeared to fall on his side. The referee ruled otherwise, and the audience rose against the decision. An explanation was impossible in the noise, and the curtain was rung down.

In the week 15 to 20 February 1909 Harry Houdini performed at Hulme Hippodrome. From images of a publicity bill, during the "second house" on 17 February 1909 he was challenged to escape from a bespoke restraint made locally by Harry Foster, a saddler based at 4 Upper Jackson Street, Hulme - "horses carefully measured and neatly fitted". There are similar mutual-publicity examples from his performances in other areas.

Around 1910 it's reported that Stan Laurel appeared at the Hipp as a young man before going to America. His stage name at a young age was Stanley Jefferson, being a member of the Fred Karno troupe and reportedly making his professional debut in Manchester. He was on stage with Frank Lisbon and understudying Charlie Chaplin. In 1912 Stan Laurel moved to the USA as part of the Fred Karno company.

In June 1911 the following preview was given:

 A strong variety programme will be presented at the Hulme Hippodrome, the artists including Scott and Whaley, eccentric coloured comedians, the Hadji Mohammed troupe of acrobats, and Jack Stephens and Company in a farcical skit entitled Shooting. 

In 1915 Gracie Fields led in a variety revue called, Yes, I Think So, which premiered on the Broadhead circuit of theatres which included Hulme Hippodrome.  She appeared also as a solo act in the last week of March 1915.   The Tiller Girls dance company (formed in Manchester in 1889) performed at the Hulme Hippodrome (1912) as did Randolf Sutton (1930). 

From May 1915 the following performance was reviewed:

 I've Seen the 'Arem is a burlesque of high quality, and at the Hulme Hippodrome it quickly finds favour. The fun is fast and furious, and the singing and dancing are also splendid. Dan Clark and Tommy Mostol and Jimmy Kurry are the principals. The Flying W.... [indistinct] in a comedy ariel act, and Warner, a dancing violinist, are also on the bill.

And similarly in June 1915, with Will Garland, a Black American entertainer:

 There is a particularly strong company at the Hulme Hippodrome. King and Bennon lead the way with their well-known Messenger Boy and 'Some' Girl business. Will Garland's troupe of dancing entertainers are very amusing, and Olivia Madison gives clever impressions.
Will Garland, producer and performer, was at Hulme Hippodrome again in March 1917 in Coloured Society.

George Formby appeared at the Hulme Hippodrome between 1923 and 1935, including in his own revue, Formby Seeing Life (1925) which was described in The Manchester Programme as "a distinct success. He works hard, and as the simple looking lad from Wigan gets the better of most arguments."

1930s - new owners 
Following the death of WH Broadhead in 1931 the theatre was sold to the Buxton Estates in 1932, reportedly to help the family pay death duties, and in November 1938 it was sold on to the Brennan Circuit although the lease to J & C Lever Theatre ran on to June 1940. A grandson of WH Broadhead, Alfred Burt-Briggs (1912-2004), wrote an unpublished memoir of the Broadhead Circuit and kept a family archive of papers relating to the 17 theatres.

From an account of variety theatre work, in the 1930s the Floral Hall next to the Hipp was used during the daytime for rehearsals and auditions, as described here:

 "If it was the Manchester area, the pantomime would probably be assembled and rehearsed in studios attached to the Hulme Hippodrome, where auditions would be held for extra parts and [speciality] acts. The pantomime might begin at the Hulme Hippodrome, before taking in the Salford Royal Hippodrome, the Liverpool Pavilion, and a couple more. Finally Wal [Butler, comedian and producer] and his stars, 'with an all star cast including your repertory favourites' would bring the show off the road at the end of the last week in January, before the theatres returned to their normal repertory."

From a newspaper report in 1933, Hulme Hippodrome and other theatres in Manchester had been closed for a "summer vacation" and would reopen on the Bank Holiday at the end of August. This was probably a regular arrangement each year.

In August 1934 the theatre management (GH Barrasford) published a celebratory advertisement in The Stage about the popularity of the play of the novel Love On The Dole by Walter Greenwood (1933), saying, "Last week at the Hippodrome, Hulme (the seventh week it has played Manchester this year) ... Total receipts £915-1-6". Wendy Hiller was the lead actor in this performance, it having transferred from the Prince's Theatre in Manchester. The play was first performed on 26 February 1934 by the Manchester Repertory Theatre company at the their theatre in Rusholme, Manchester.

In February 1935 the Manchester Watch Committee permitted Hulme Hippodrome and a number of other local theatres to sell alcohol for the first time, limited to sales during one 15-minute intermission in each performance. Previously any theatre in Manchester with two shows each evening was not allowed to sell alcohol.  

In February 1937 a further Walter Greenwood play was performed at the Hipp, Give Us This Day, based on his novel His Worship The Mayor. The play has previously been called, Special Area.

In his memoir, Randle Cutts could remember from his childhood seeing billboards for Duggie Wakefield, Billy Nelson, Chuck O'Neil and Jack Butler as a comedy troupe called The Boys from Manchester appearing at the Hipp.

An extensive coverage of the variety acts performing at Hulme Hippodrome between 1920 and 1940 was compiled by Roger Rolls and self-published as a book in 2000. His father was on the staff at the Hulme Hippodrome playing the violin in the resident 'orchestra', having learnt to play to regain work after being gassed in the First World War.

In 2016 Cicely Peover, 90, wrote about her memories of 'Hulme Hipp' from the 1930s when as a child where she would go to the:

 "first house on a Saturday night. Always in the circle ... my sister and I were with grandpa who loved 'variety' and brought a quarter of jellied almonds to eat during the show. Jugglers, acrobats, dancers, singers, the wonderfully funny Albert Modley, seals who played motor horns and even a circus. The aroma on that occasion was rather more pungent than the usual cosy, plushy theatre smell! Boxing Day would mean the annual panto when Eileen and I could wear a new 'best' winter dress." (A "quarter" was a quarter of a pound in weight, just over 100g)

1940s – (second) Manchester Repertory Theatre 
On 8 July 1940 the theatre re-opened "after extensive decorating, re-seating, carpeting, re-lighting (stage and auditorium)" and being "under new management from 24 June 1940" according to a trade advertisement. The new owner was Hulme Hippodrome Ltd, with Mr WJ Boyle as managing director and Mr T Rawlinson as chairman. However six months after their purchase the Hulme Hipp it closed on Saturday 18 January 1941, thus: 

 "We have been compelled to close this theatre because of the serious effect the enemy action on Manchester has had upon business." and the seating capacity was now 1,750 people (from correspondence dated 21 January 1941).

At some point after January 1941 the Hipp reopened, probably between 1942 and 1949, the productions were staged by the Manchester Repertory Theatre.  

From a memoir including childhood in the war years,  

 "For a time at the beginning of the war the performance times were staggered but this quickly gave way to normal times twice nightly. At Christmas and for the next month there was the usual Fortescue pantomimes mostly  ... the normal repertory acting company. ... Immediately prior to the pantomime the company would probably perform a week of children's plays adapted from children's classics by a cast member. The pattern continued throughout the war but as things settled down the pantomimes became more variety orientated again. ... [During the war] Tin helmets and gas masks were carried and worn by Front of House personnel. The St Johns Ambulance Brigade attended every performance and if an air raid started, audiences could take shelter in the indicated street air raid shelter, though few seldom did and the performance continued as normally as possible to the accompaniment of the drone of bombers, bombs and anti-aircraft fire. Artistes and Front of House staff alike were obliged to do fire watching duty in the fire watching towers built on the roofs of the theatres, and had to extinguish incendiary bombs."

One press report partially dates this period by saying, "For a few years after the war it was a repertory theatre but it reverted to variety and revue", however the name had been used "as an alternative title since 1943" and then permanently from July 1946. The company advertised themselves as the Manchester Repertory Theatre, but sometimes "Second" was later added to the name to differentiate them from an earlier rep company active from 1907 to c.1917. One example in September 1942 was their production of the play Double Door, originally from the USA in 1933.

Frank H. Fortescue Players / Companies 
There were at least two 'war plays' written by Zelda Davees, a local resident and a former rep actor: Wearing the Pants (1941); and Without Them We Perish (1944) based on the Manchester air raid and performed by the Frank H Fortescue's Famous Players. According to IMDb the play Wearing the Pants became a screenplay for the film Those People Next Door (1953). It was made by Mancunian Films in Rusholme at the film studios on Dickenson Road, later bought by the BBC in 1954 for TV productions.  

Other Manchester Repertory Theatre advertised performances at Hulme Hippodrome were Married Blitz (June 1945) and The Chinese Bungalow (October 1945). From a press report in July 1946: 

 "The Hulme Hippodrome has been used by Mr Frank H Fortescue's repertory companies for the last five years, and over 250 different plays have been performed. Plays are given twice nightly and are generally popular in appeal. The previous Manchester Repertory Theatre Ltd went into liquidation in 1940. Mr Armitage Owen, its director, then took some of the members of the company to North Wales, where (apart from occasional tours) they have been ever since. ... He added that it had always been his intention to keep the name of the Manchester Repertory Company alive until it could return to a theatre in Manchester."

Repertory theatre is the idea of a permanent company of actors performing in just one theatre with a learnt catalogue of plays performed in rotation for a week at a time. Before that acting companies had to tour, and usually with just one play. Because it was grounded in one place, rep theatre led to more working class culture appearing on the stage.  It seems that the Broadhead circuit of theatres added a variation to this rep model; with its resident companies based at their 'home' theatres in Hulme Hippodrome, Bury Hippodrome and Queen's Park Hippodrome, (Harpurhey, 1904-1966) and where the companies toured locally within the circuit. An advantage of this rotation was each theatre was able to stage more than one pantomime story each season.

In a biography of a variety artist and comedian, Wal Butler, between 1920 and 1950 - The 12.40 From Crewe - Randle Cutts relates some details about the Fortescue company, as follows:

 "These [theatrical revues] were mounted by Frank H Fortescue and Terence Byron, who were both responsible for repertory [companies] and owned theatres. Not much is known about either. They were enigmas. Between them they were responsible for the employment of hundreds of artistes at any one time, thousands overall. They didn't pay fabulous wages, but for anyone who came under their wings, all the year round work was ensured. Frank H Fortescue was a Birmingham man, whose main area of acting as an impresario was in the North West [of England], although he put in companies all over the country. Exactly the same in every respect was Terence Byron, whose offices were at 35, Abingdon Street, Blackpool. They had an agreement between themselves that all revues, pantomimes and repertory plays would play one another's theatres, and they also had an agreement with the Broadhead organisation that these would work the "Bread and Butter" Circuit as well."

In his self-published memoir The Bread and Butter Tour - A Theatrical Journey Through The North West, Randle Cutts, described his visits in the post-war variety era to theatres in what was still regarded as the Broadhead Circuit. He said that artists who worked regularly on this circuit called it the bread and butter tour, because although it didn't pay very much, they were continuously in work. Randle Cutts was a school teacher in Oldham and a theatre enthusiast whose father managed a building firm based in North Manchester employing around 120 people, holding the maintenance contract for the Hipp as well as other theatres.

The British theatre format of rep had been created in Manchester in 1907 by Miss Horniman as she was known, (Annie Horniman 1860-1937) when she transformed The Gaiety Theatre in Manchester city centre. Her ‘project’ lasted just under 10 years but it left a lasting mark and was adopted by theatres across Britain. It was known as the ‘Manchester School’ of drama.

There was a cross-over between rep actors and variety performers, for example Eric Sykes who was born in Oldham and worked in rep at Oldham Coliseum and other theatres also did some comedy work on stage, before being hired by Frankie Howerd to write his Variety Bandbox acts and then appearing on stage again for the BBC, now as a comedian himself. 

In 1950 the theatre name reverted to being - Hulme Hippodrome.

Refurbishment 
Reverting to being called Hulme Hippodrome, in 1950 the theatre was used again for variety performances. This change followed a short closure for an internal refurbishment reportedly paid for by Dorothy Squires ('Dot', married to Roger Moore) and Billy Dainty, although others attribute the funding to James Brennan, who had added The Playhouse to his property portfolio in 1950. This refurbishment reduced the seating capacity by 300, down to 1,530 seats. A press report in March 1950 said:

 "The Hulme Hippodrome, which changed over to variety a short while ago, has already acquired a distinctive atmosphere of popularity. ... The audience did a lot towards making the show go with a swing, and, with the theatre renovated with plenty of comfortable red plush and gilt cherubs, one sensed a long-established tradition rather than a new venture, a feeling that it is still the music-hall which is the people's theatre."
The Ink Spots played at Hulme Hippodrome, 31 October to 5 November 1949.

In May 1950 a theatre review reported that Hulme Hippodrome was "Still finding its feet [again] as a variety theatre". 

However, as one theatrical biographer noted, "The world of popular theatre had changed during the war, never to be the same again. The old touring circuits gradually began to collapse, but at first it was 'business as usual' in the immediate post war boom."

1950s – BBC recordings at the Hipp (1950–1961)

1950s – BBC general 
The earliest known radio outside broadcasts from Hulme Hippodrome are from February 1950: starting with a long-running series Variety Fanfare; plus The Norman Evans Show later in the year; and a 30-minute excerpt of a performance of the Hipp's seasonal Cinderella pantomime, transmitted on 5 January 1951 starring Frank Randle and Josef Locke.

From the BBC Written Archives Centre, Caversham, a file of correspondence exists on venue hire details for recordings at Hulme Hippodrome, with around 24 titles of different programmes recorded between February 1950 and January 1961, mostly radio with some TV towards the end. These archive papers are not exhaustive, and relate to venue hire details with just the programme titles being included in venue booking letters rather than the details of the creative content of each programme. The BBC hired the Hulme Hippodrome auditorium on Sunday evenings when there were no public performances, to make radio (audio) recordings of variety acts for radio programmes (and later TV) such as the regional then national programme series, Variety Fanfare.    

In the 1950s there were three BBC radio networks or 'services' - Home, Light, and Third. The Light Service and the Third Programme were national services, and the Home Service was also national but with six regional opt-outs, one being NEHS - the North of England Home Service. Some of the recordings made at the Hulme Hippodrome were for the NEHS regional opt-out slots in the Home Service, and some were made for the Light Service which was national. 

The BBC Northern Dance Orchestra (NDO) was based at The Playhouse and was created on 1956; following on from the BBC Northern Variety Orchestra which was created on 1 April 1951 but is less researched to date. Analogue audio magnetic tapes of both orchestras are held in archives.

From a book on the history of the BBC's Variety Department, in the post-war years there was a need to find good recording venues:
 "studio and rehearsal facilities remained little short of deplorable with outdated fittings and equipment" and "Geoff Lawrence, who worked in Variety [Department] in Manchester, remembered the 'good, healthy, constructive and positive atmosphere .. [with] a friendly rivalry about it.' He continued, 'We had a pretty good regional head of programmes who talked our language ... and we were allowed that delightful freedom to experiment'."

In another book, the then programme engineer Peter Pilbeam explained about his work recording acts inside the Hulme Hippodrome for BBC radio:

 "We had a permanent outside broadcast control room in the circle, which was in fact a garden shed. No sound insulation whatsoever, it was an impossible place get a decent balance out of anything. We heard more through the walls than we did from the loudspeaker. We did some good stuff there, though."
This control room was called a 'removable box' and it was required urgently by the BBC in February 1950, ordered ten days before it was needed, at a cost of £38.

Peter Pilbeam went on to be a BBC producer. As shown in a poster, he produced the first BBC radio performance by The Beatles with Pete Best on drums, on Teenagers' Turn - Here We Go, recorded in the BBC's Playhouse studio on 7 March 1962, transmitted on 8 March 1962 (next door to Hulme Hippodrome). In total they appeared five times in this radio series.

1950s – BBC Variety Fanfare 
In some reports, Variety Fanfare (1950–1954), started as a regional radio programme, though by August 1952 the Radio Times describes it as being broadcast on the (national) Light Service. Some reports have Variety Fanfare as the North's answer to London's Variety Bandbox. The radio series Northern Variety Parade started around 1956.    

Produced for the BBC between February 1950 and June 1954, firstly by Bowker Andrews and then Ronnie Taylor, Variety Fanfare was a career-building radio series for many Northern comedians including Morecambe and Wise. There are also reports that these early 1950s radio performances by comedians included Bob Monkhouse, Ken Platt, and Al Read, with Frankie Vaughan as a warm-up artist. Tony Handcock performed in Variety Fanfare, transmitted on 20 June 1954. Ronnie Taylor's uncatalogued archive is held at the V&A, inaccessible until 2024 when their new archive building opens.   

The BBC described Variety Fanfare in the Radio Times as, "high speed variety". The high speed variety format was developed in the UK in the 1930s, imported from the US vaudeville, where there were no pauses between acts and artists would be fined if they caused a 'stage wait'. "A gap between acts was known as a 'stage wait',... an unforgivable sin in any performance... In a No 1 theatre heads would roll!" Prior to the 1930s, variety in the UK included many long pauses, for example for costume changes in the wings mid-way as well as between acts.

1950s - BBC & Al Read, comedian 
Al Read's breakthrough radio broadcast was on 17 February 1950 on Variety Fanfare; produced by Bowker Andrews with Ronnie Taylor polishing his improvised sketch into a script. He previously had had stage fright, which may explain why the sketch was recorded in a studio, however it quickly led to his regular performances on stage in further Variety Fanfare episodes, recorded at Hulme Hippodrome. Nevertheless, when he appeared on stage for recordings the BBC stipulated to the venue managers that no-one could sit in the circle or balcony, only on the ground level in the stalls. 

The Al Read Show was recorded at Hulme Hippodrome probably between 1952 and 1955 following a trial recording on 5 August 1951.  A press article in 2001 was written as a 50-year retrospective about Al Read. Based on a set of self-published books by Mike Craig, Look Back With Laughter (1996) the article said:

 "When Al Read's brand of northern humour hit the airwaves... he became an overnight star. ... a BBC radio variety producer ... persuaded [Al Read] to repeat the stories on the show Variety Fanfare, produced each week at the Hulme Hippodrome. The spot was so successful that ... he was [later] engaged by the BBC as resident comedian on Variety Bandbox" recorded in London. He later played at the Adelphi Theatre in London and in several Royal Variety Shows.
In his autobiography published in 1985, Al Read says, "From the beginning I recorded my [monthly] radio shows at the Paris Pullman cinema, Regent Street." in London. From archived copies of correspondence between the BBC and Hulme Hippodrome the venue was booked for the "Al Read Show" on 6 December 1953, 17 January 1954, 20 March , 23 October and 6 November 1955, and 24 June 1956. This minority of recordings, as well as the trial in 1951, may have been while he was visiting family members in Salford.

1950s – BBC & Morecambe & Wise, comedians 
In their first substantial series of radio broadcasts on the BBC, Morecambe and Wise featured in 45 episodes of Variety Fanfare from Hulme Hippodrome.

Morecambe and Wise had their first radio show of their own at the Hipp, You're Only Young Once originally for six episodes (broadcast: 9 Nov - 14 Dec 1953; Home Service, North region) then extended to nine episodes (broadcast: 22 Dec 1953 - 4 Jan 1954), all produced by Ronnie Taylor and recorded at Hulme Hippodrome. 

They later appeared in a radio series in 1955, The Show Goes On, in the variety format with other artists including Ken Dodd, same producer and venue (recorded: 27 March, 17 April 1955; broadcast: 31 March, 21 April 1955; and other dates, Light Programme [national]).

Morecambe and Wise also played at least three live acts to regular paying audiences at Hulme Hippodrome, Monday to Saturday, one time as second billing to the ventriloquist Dennis Spicer. One week's performance by Morecambe and Wise was 6-11 December 1954 where they were top of the bill, with details in a printed programme.

In 2009, Doreen Wise rediscovered a collection of recordings (magnetic tapes and acetate discs) at home, made at Hulme Hippodrome by the BBC sound engineers for Ernie Wise in addition to the BBC official recordings of some of their radio sessions. Excerpts of his collection were rebroadcast on BBC Radio 4 in 2010.

1950s – BBC TV 
A TV programme known to have been made at Hulme Hippodrome which was broadcast on Sunday 2 October 1955, possibly live, was called, Northern Lights, and the listing details are: "The BBC North Region presents stars from show business with the Raymond Woodhead Singers [plus the] BBC Northern Variety Orchestra, conducted by Alyn Ainsworth before an invited audience in the Hulme Hippodrome, Manchester. Produced by Ronnie Taylor and Eric Miller."

In December 1955, the connecting doorways in the party wall between the conjoined theatres were bricked up when the BBC bought the Playhouse Theatre from James Brennan to use as a full-time radio and TV recording studio, using it for 30 years until around 1986.

There are records of the Call Boy programme (aka The Clitheroe Kid) being recorded ("filmed") for BBC TV, moving on from its previous radio format, on 12 December 1956 at Hulme Hipp.

The programme You're Welcome was also a one-hour "TV film" made in 1956 with the Northern Variety Orchestra, possibly at Hulme Hipp.

1950s – variety, revue, rock and rRoll

Strictly Northern 
"So it was after 1950 when I first attended [the Hipp] and I was entranced. This was like no other theatre I had ever visited before, strictly northern in its approach rather than cosmopolitan and offering different shows and [artistes] that I had ever seen before. I wasn't to know at the time that I was about to witness the last glorious kick of the post war variety boom before the theatre closed its doors to live stage entertainment forever."

1950s – artists on stage at the Hip 
In "about 1951, 1952" Ken Dodd was playing on stage at the Hipp, as a 'guest artist' or stand-in as he later said, on contract to James Brennan, including appearing in the same bill as Ted Lune. It was around this time that Ken Dodd said he appeared on the same radio programme recorded at the Hipp as Max Miller, a hero of his. Max Miller had been 'demoted' to play 'number two' theatres for around 18 months after he deliberately over-ran his stage act at the Royal Variety Performance on 13 November 1950. Ken Dodd and Max Miller also appeared in the same episode of the BBC radio programme recorded at the Hipp, The Show Goes On, recorded on 27 March 1955 and broadcast nationally on the Light Programme on 31 March 1955.

On 17 September 1953 Shirley Bassey appeared with other singers in the touring show, Memories of Jolson. This was said to be her first professional tour as a singer. She next appeared in May 1954 in Harlem Jazz, where a newspaper review of her performance at Hulme Hippodrome said, "Shirley Bassey sings old and new blues tunes with real zip".

Barry Took made his premiere professional career appearance in August 1951 at the Hulme Hippodrome.

The increasing use of the revue format for a whole 2-hour performance was to save costs. The revue format booked and used all the artists as a single company, with each artist taking on multiple roles across the different slots. As Randle S. Cutts noted in his memoir:

 "Jimmy Brennan couldn't keep putting on the same names ad infinitum so he joined forces with Will Collins, a very experienced producer / agent, who had a host of names in his stable. For the first time at the Hippodrome Will Collins brought in top class pantomimes which ran longer, running several weeks. ... He was able to provide whole reviews with supporters."

In October 1955 there was press coverage over a 'kangaroo' (probably smaller, a wallaby) that went missing from the Hipp, as follows:

 An illusionist's kangaroo was captured by police after it had been seen hopping along Cornbrook Street, Old Trafford, Manchester, early yesterday. It waited in a city police cell to be bailed out by the Great Levante, who makes it disappear every night. Jo-Jo, who is six months old and two feet tall, vanishes regularly on the stage for the illusionist. On Monday he vanished completely from Hulme Hippodrome. Mr Levante's manager said: "He must have been taken, because he could not just wander about without being spotted."

During 2–7 March 1953 and again for the week of 18 - 23 April 1955 there was an Ice Show at the Hulme Hipp, using freezing equipment which had to be installed "with all possible speed" on the Sunday.

In the winter of 1957-58 the pantomime at the Hipp was Babes in the Wood, starring the variety singer Mary Naylor. The following year the panto season was Aladdin and His Wonderful Lamp, featuring The Mudlarks.

1950s – rock 'n roll 
In the later 1950s the theatre was used at times for Rock and Roll performances, sometimes within a wider variety programme. For example, from a poster, Art Baxter and His Rock and Roll Sinners were playing within an 11-acts programme on 11 February 1957, and appearing again on 8 April 1957.

The following Rock and Roll, Skiffle and other musical acts reportedly played at the Hulme Hippodrome, 1956 to 1959, however the listings include some confusions between Hulme Hipp and Manchester Hipp. The Chas McDevitt and the Terry Dene gigs have been corroborated with surviving printed programmes and posters for Hulme Hipp:

 The Hilltoppers, 27 August 1956
 Mitchell Torok, 18 - 23 March 1957
 Max Wall, 24 - 29 June 1957
 Chas McDevitt Skiffle Group, 5 - 10 August 1957
 Terry Dene; The Teenagers, 3 - 8 February 1958 (note: 28 October - 2 November 1957 was at Manchester Hip).

In his book on skiffle during the mid-1950s, Billy Bragg wrote: "Jim Reno, owner of Reno's music store in Manchester, one of the largest in the north of England, declared, 'I cannot cope with the demand for guitars with young lads in here every day asking for them. One day last week I sold 100 guitars'."

However, some people at the time reported that the addition of rock 'n roll acts drove away the previously regular variety customers, though others also blamed TV for this audience decline. One contemporary account reported:

 "The final nail in the coffin of the variety theatres was the introductions of rock n’ roll turns, which alienated the regular customers. No longer could standard variety acts be relied upon [to fill theatres], and regular patrons showed their displeasure by stamping out noisily through the crash doors when these [musicians] appeared, never to return."

1950s – circus animal acts 
Performances (turns) that included animals were a regular feature in variety performances, and sometimes the whole programme would consist of animal acts from a visiting 'circus' or 'zoo'. For example, on 9-15 December 1957 the Hip Hip Zoo Ray performance by the Robert Brothers Circus was given twice each night (6.30pm, 8.30pm) "presenting animals from the four corners of the earth" including elephants, lions, llamas, ponies, kangaroos, cats and poodles. Other performances were given the Royal Italian Circus, the Chapmans Circus, the Royal Majestic Circus with Harry Benet, and the Royal Imperial Circus with Don Ross. At times the stage had to have its basement supports reinforced for the extra weight of these performances. From the same memoir as much of this circus information, "Circuses travelling by rail were just starting up again and that was also a big part of [the work by railway liaison and theatre staff in] attending to the animals, walking the elephants to the Hulme Hippodrome, stabling them under the railway arches etc."

This was a continuation of animal acts from previous times. For example, writing about pantomimes in the 1930s Randle Cutts noted that they often included animals:

 "There was a choice of several miniature circuses to include, like Wrights, Aliens or Gandeys. They brought ponies, dogs, monkeys etc. The ponies served the double purpose of pulling Cinderella's illuminated coach. The Circus might provide acrobats or a low-wire act as a 'spesh'. [speciality acts]"

1950s – nudity 
In terms of 'adult' entertainment being shown in variety theatres, it had been a component of shows for many years, and Hulme Hippodrome was no different. The advertising term often used was 'revue'. For example “Nudity was nothing new in variety. In 1937, an American striptease artist called Diana Raye was booked to appear ... at the [London] Palladium”. Although this trend had started before the Second World War, the 1950s saw it increase, for example, there were “the low-budget touring nude revues that increasingly dominated the dying circuit in the 1950s. The name La Clique is an interesting choice of title, suggesting a show aimed at a select” clientele and hoping for a sophisticated image for the venues. 

Specific examples of such shows at Hulme Hippodrome included, Don't Blush Girls, How To Undress (July 1939), Bon Soir, Mesdames - The Nudes Internationale (August 1950), Strip Tease Special, and Strip! Strip! Hooray! (both July 1958).

There are elders within the Save Hulme Hippodrome campaign who have recorded in oral history sessions their memories from being young children living in Hulme in the 1950s and visiting the Hipp, often unaccompanied. These records include watching the act, Jane (Chrystabel Leighton-Porter), at a time before there were age-appropriate restrictions on who could attend performances. The elders group also remember seeing the nude tableau vivant led by Phyllis Dixey.

1950s – Coronation Street actors 
The TV programme Coronation Street started on ITV (Granada) in 1960, and at least three of its initial actors had worked previously in the 1950s at Hulme Hippodrome and other theatres. Violet Carson (as Ena Sharples) had previously played the piano at Hulme Hippodrome. Jill Summers (as Phyllis Pearce) had appeared as a comedian with a stage role as a railway porter in uniform and with a trolley and two suitcases as props, telling stories and jokes. Bill Waddington (as Percy Sugden) had appeared in pantomime as The Old Woman who Lived in a Shoe.

Another Coronation Street actor was Arthur Lowe, who also later starred in Dad's Army. He had acted in the army entertainments during the Second World War, and afterwards he joined the Frank H Fortescue Company at the Hulme Hippodrome, where he met his wife, Joan Cooper, the company's leading lady.

Don Estelle, the actor and singer, was born in Crumpsall, Manchester, and he first performed in front of a live theatre audience when singing the same song 12 times a week in the show The Backyard Kids at the Hulme Hippodrome in the early 1950s. In the 1960s he worked as an acting extra at Granada Television, throwing darts in the Rovers Return in Coronation Street. It was while working there that Arthur Lowe suggested he contact Jimmy Perry and David Croft, which got him a minor part in 1969 in the 10-year series of Dad's Army as a delivery worker and later the role of Gerald, a deputy ARP Warden. This work led to his leading role with the character of Lofty in Perry and Croft's series, It Ain't Half Hot Mum from 1974 to 1981.

1950s – oral history programme on both theatres, Radio 4 
On 2 April 2002 BBC Radio 4 broadcast episode 3 of 6 in the Palace of Laughter series, this episode being on The Playhouse and Hulme Hippodrome. It was produced by Libby Cross and presented by Geoffrey Wheeler, with interviews with Ken Dodd, Jimmy Casey, Johnny Roadhouse, Ronnie Taylor, and Roy Chappell. Clips used included Al Read, and Morecambe and Wise. A copy exists online. and a transcript is available.

1960s to 1980s – Mecca Bingo 
In October 1957 Jimmy Brennan told the BBC he was prepared to sell them Hulme Hippodrome to add to their 1955 purchase from him of The Playhouse theatre. He was asking for £60,000 with the shops, or £50,000 without the shops. In March 1959 a team of BBC officials inspected the premises. Their conclusion was that it would not be suitable acoustically for a 70-person orchestra because the stage would be too small, especially if there were "small choirs", and extending the stage into the auditorium would create 'two acoustics'. The offer to sell is declined by the BBC in April 1960.

The Hippodrome was probably last used as a variety theatre for the public in 1960. Possibly the last pantomime staged was Dick Whittington and his Cat from 24 December 1959 for five and a half weeks into January 1960.

Second bar 
From an archived draft report to the Watch Committee dated 19 January 1960 the permission that had been given in 1935, allowing alcohol sales for the first time, was for a single bar "on the first-floor balcony to the Floral Hall" with a drinking area of 25 m2, which shortly afterwards had an approved increase of 45 m2; a total of 70 m2.  

"A further application to increase this area [had been] refused by the Committee in August 1939." according to the background details in the 1960 report. 

The report focussed on a proposal to the Committee to reduce the size of the first floor bar and the create a new bar on the ground floor of the Floral Hall, which was recommended for approval. It is possible that Jimmy Brennan applied for approval for a second bar in order to make the property more valuable when selling.

Bill Benny 
In November 1960 the Hipp was bought by Bill Benny (1918-1963) for £35,000. Bill Benny by then had retired as a professional wrestler and was working as a theatrical agent and promoter and was an alleged gangster.  He used the Hipp for 'adult' entertainment and a number of archived black & white photographs exist from this era showing the exterior of the building with large posters for 'nude shows'. Probably from this time, "The Queen was visiting the area when a striptease show was showing. Her Majesty's Royal entourage was to pass posters advertising it. It was arranged that the title of the attraction should be blacked out so as not to offend Royalty."  

Bill Benny was associated with the Quality Street Gang and with the criminal Jimmy Savile who managed the Mecca-owned Plaza Ballroom which was adjacent to Benny's Cabaret Club on Oxford Road.  

For three months in 1961 (17 June - 15 Sept 1961) the Hulme Hipp was rented by the BBC (full-time, not just on Sundays) from Bill Benny for broadcasting light entertainment programmes while The Playhouse was being refurbished, with invited audiences. 

In April 1962 Bill Benny sold the Hipp to Mecca Entertainments for use as a bingo hall. He was paid in Mecca shares reportedly worth somewhere between £35,000 and £50,000. The same month the New Musical Express (NME) published a photograph of Bill Benny meeting in the USA with Vic Lewis, Elvis Presley and Colonel Tom Parker to try to arrange for Elvis to perform at a charity concert in the UK, which was unsuccessful.

Mecca 
The Hipp was initially renamed as Mecca Bingo Preston Street and later as the Mecca Social Club, though photographs show "Hippodrome" lettering on the aluminium cladding added during the 1960s or 1970s. The venue reportedly closed in 1988.

The 1962 purchase led to some internal changes, in particular the sloping auditorium had a wooden 'false' floor built to create a level surface for the change in layout from rows of theatre seating to a grid pattern of bingo tables with chairs around them. This new floor was almost level to the stage height. The stage was also 'boxed in' to make it smaller. These wooden constructions have since been removed. There were also two external changes: one of the shop units was converted to become a new and wider doorway for access to the bingo hall, and the booking office window at the front was made smaller.

In a press report a spokesperson for Mecca said, 

 "it will be redecorated and will reopen in about five weeks ... The theatre was 'broken down and needing a lot of improvements,' but these would be carried out without destroying the character of the building. ... the theatre would be available for amateur operatic and dramatic societies which might want to stage Christmas pantomimes or musical shows."

From June to August 1968 there is correspondence held in Archives-Plus (in Manchester Central Library) which includes planning discussions between Mecca Ltd, BBC, and Manchester City Council planners on the details of a planned refurbishment scheme.

1960s – urban regeneration 
On 11 April 1962 there is a press report concerning the state of the houses around Hulme Hippodrome, saying it was "the biggest area to be recommended for slum clearance in Manchester since the war", leading to 1,280 homes being demolished by around 1965 and many of the old roads being 'stopped up' and removed. This urban renewal displaced many families who were the theatre's local audiences, before new residents returned to live in Hulme. The newspaper article mentions Hulme Hippodrome in particular:

 "The latest area includes the Playhouse Theatre, now used by the BBC, and the Hulme Hippodrome Theatre, which has just been taken over by Mecca Ltd, and is to be converted mainly as a hall for bingo and horsey-horsey. A corporation official said that they would not necessarily be affected by the clearance of neighbouring properties. Their future would be considered separately when the proposals to redevelop the area were considered."

As a consequence of these proposals, Preston Street which was the main road at the front of Hulme Hippodrome was removed ('stopped up') and only a footpath now remains from one of the pavements.

Many of the displaced residents still object to Hulme being called a "slum" in official reports, for example from an oral history project within the Save Hulme Hippodrome campaign. Reportedly many of the families living in Hulme were "removed by the Manchester Corporation to overspill estates on Langley Estate, Middleton and Darnhill Estate, Heywood". There was a further phase of other urban regeneration in Hulme in the 1990s, removing many of the 1960s buildings, yet still leaving the role of the 1901 Hulme Hippodrome unresolved.

1970s – Mecca Social Club, and listed building status
By 1971, the remaining shop frontages had been rendered over and the rooms were used for storage with new internal doorways. Aluminium cladding had been added to a substantial amount of the exterior of the building. Around 1977, Mecca had ceased to use the building for bingo and were running it as a social club. 

On 8 June 1977, the Hulme Hippodrome was recognised for its architectural importance and became a Grade 2 listed building.

1980s – night club, snooker hall, music gigs 
Around 1986 the social club was closed and the building was briefly run as a night club before its use was changed again in 1987 to be used as a snooker and billiards hall. Reportedly this is the period when the Floral Hall was divided with additional floors and ceilings.  

From posters and correspondence, in the years 1987-89 the ground floor of the Floral Hall was used for music gigs by local bands, including The Wild Panzis, Metal Monkey Machine (with others, 10 March 1988), Slum Turkeys, and the Tunnel Frenzies. A typical gig was an evening of five bands playing to around 100 people.  

In an interview in 2018, Mark Kermode said:  

 "If someone did a rock family tree of all the bands that didn’t make it in Manchester in the 1980s, it would go on for absolute miles. One of the weird things about [this] period was, particularly in Hulme where I lived, everyone was in a band; most people were in two or three at the same time. It was all incredibly internecine. I remember being in a friend’s flat in Charles Barry Crescent, and A Guy Called Gerald was down one way, and Russians Eat Bambi were down that way, and Jamie who ran The Kitchen recording studio was upstairs – it was more like a crèche for musicians than it was a housing estate at that point. So, yes, it would make a brilliant family tree but it would be so hard to unravel."

1990s – going dark for a decade 
By 1990 the auditorium had ceased to be used commercially, and the building was later placed on Manchester City Council's Buildings At Risk Register, and in 2006 was added to the Theatre Trust's newly-created Theatres At Risk Register. In May 1994, a Manchester-based photographer specialising in documenting its regeneration, took a series of internal shots of the auditorium which are now held in Manchester's Central Library.

2003–2017 – church services and music gigs

Brooks Wilkinson Ltd 
At some point Mecca Entertainments sold the Hipp to Brooks Wilkinson Ltd, a regional company originally in Derbyshire that had been established in 1974 to own theatres, bingo halls and gambling venues. The sale was possibly made between 1993 and 1997 based on mortgage charges notified to Companies House.

Gilbert Deya Ministries (religious charity) 
From details in the Land Register the building was then bought from Brooks Wilkinson Ltd on 26 August 2003 for £152,615 by the Gilbert Deya Ministries (GDM) a controversial religious charity. 

The GDM charity has been officially investigated twice (2004 - 2006, and 2016 - ongoing) or possibly three times by the Charity Commission.  

Their services were held on the ground floor of the Floral Hall, adjacent to the main auditorium. The religious charity reportedly spent £200,000 on ad-hoc repairs to the Floral Hall portion of the building around 2015. 

Following a scandal in the UK with press coverage in 2004 there was a contested extradition of Gilbert Deya in 2017 from the UK to Nairobi, Kenya to face trial on charges of child kidnapping and associated child trafficking to the UK, the charges are denied and the case is ongoing. The charity has been associated with a complex cluster of short-life private companies. There was a further press scandal in 2016.

The contested sale of the Hipp in November 2020 by some people in GDM to a south London property developer is detailed below.

2004 – Bingo Jesus iconic sign 
When the religious charity bought the building there was an existing Bingo rigid sign fixed high on the early 1970s metal cladding on the east wall facing Warwick Street. Probably in late 2003 or early 2004 based on surviving photographs, the charity fixed a banner at the same height beside that sign with the single word, Jesus. These two signs - Bingo Jesus - remained side by side until the signs were removed some years later (maybe 2012), along with the underlying metal cladding, based on photographs.  This combined signage became an iconic cultural reference for many people in Hulme, for example forming a permanent wall display in the Lass O'Gowrie pub (M1 7DB) and with a local psychedelic rock band naming themselves after the sign.

2006 – Theatres Trust, Theatres at Risk Register 
Hulme Hippodrome has been listed in the national Theatres at Risk (TAR) Register since it was first compiled in 2006 by the Theatres Trust, a register which is updated annually.

2012 – Youth Village, music gigs 
From early 2012 to 2014 the religious charity reportedly leased the upstairs room of the Floral Hall to a community youth group, Youth Village. Following on from the late 1980s there was a further period of music gigs at Hulme Hippodrome / Floral Hall, this time organised by the Youth Village project. For example 12 bands were listed as playing on 29 September 2012 - Trash Kit, Frazer King, Halo Halo, Poppycock, Paddy Steer, Warm Widow, Ill, Now, Salford Media City, Laser Dream Eyes, Jazzbo, and Hurt Douglas. The project's Facebook group, Hulme Hippodrome, was established in May 2012, now closed. The project held an Open Day in December 2012 for visitors to see the main auditorium as a 'hidden gem'.

2016 – Friends of Hulme Hippodrome 
The Friends of Hulme Hippodrome Facebook group (established 2015) had hoped to get the building listed in 2016 as an asset of community value, which would have given the community group six months to raise the money needed to buy the building from the owner before it went out to general market. The application, however, was turned down by Manchester City Council. A council spokesman said: "There would also be a significant cost to bring the building back into use—into the millions—and without a [business] plan in place it would be unfair for us to assume they could turn the building around."

2017 – Squatters 
Squatters occupied the Hulme Hippodrome from around June 2017 to February 2018, and used the venue for music gigs until the Greater Manchester Fire and Rescue Service issued Prohibition Notices in October 2017 and on 9 February 2018 against holding public events on the basis of inadequate means of escape for the audience. The squatters occupied the Hulme Hippodrome saying they intended to bring it back into community use, and reportedly cleaning it up after years of neglect, though other accounts differ.

 The conjoined Playhouse Theatre, in the southern portion of the building, was sold at auction on 18 May 2017 at the Macron Stadium, Bolton, for £325,000. The ownership transferred from Northern Estates to C&R Properties. The Playhouse had been known as the NIA Centre (1991-1997) and currently is tenanted by and known as Niamos, a community interest company (CIC). 

In September 2019, the Hulme Hippodrome was named on the Victorian Society's list of the top ten most endangered buildings in England and Wales.

Some common myths and inaccuracies 
(A) Although Stan Laurel did appear at the Hipp around 1910, there are some incorrect reports of Laurel and Hardy appearing together in later years at Hulme Hippodrome. Laurel and Hardy did appear together on stage at four venues near to Hulme Hippodrome. The confusion might arise from their appearance at the similar-sounding Manchester Hippodrome in 1953. Details are:  

 New Oxford Picture House, Oxford Street (demolished 2017) on 2 August 1932;
 Palace Theatre, Oxford Road, from 21 July 1947 for two weeks;
 Salford Opera House; and
 New Manchester Hippodrome Theatre, Ardwick Green (demolished 1964) on 2 November 1953, part of their final UK tour, Birds of a Feather.

(B) Some incorrect reports have Nina Simone playing at the Hulme Hippodrome, whereas she appeared next door in The Playhouse at an opening event of the NIA Centre on 2 May 1991.

(C) There were local stories of a 'secret tunnel' for artists to escape the crowds outside by going from the Hulme Hippodrome to nearby lodgings in the Junction Hotel, a pub with rooms. Some stories were that this tunnel reached further to the city centre. More recent reports indicate that there probably was a Victorian storm drain at sub-basement level with an unconfirmed doorway from the Hulme Hippodrome basement toilets, and the internal height of this drain and their form as a neighbourhood network might have led to the idea of them as a means of escape.

(D) There are a few comments on some internet sites that the two theatres were previously connected by "an arcade", however there is no direct evidence for this feature in the contemporary drawn plans for the buildings. Before the internal party wall had its doorways between the two auditoriums bricked up in 1955, there might have been a shared exit corridor to the side street. If this corridor was possibly lined with photographs or framed billboards, this might have led to the phrase of an arcade being used within the community.

(E) Some rock and roll, skiffle, and other musical acts reportedly played at the Hulme Hippodrome, however the listings included some confusion between Hulme Hipp and the Manchester Hippodrome. In particular, The Quarrymen (aka Johnny and the Moondogs in 1959; later, The Beatles), reportedly played at Hulme Hipp on 15 November 1959 but this was the regional final of a TV talent show at the (New) Manchester Hippodrome in Ardwick Green, and not Hulme Hippodrome.  Another source claims for this date: "As Johnny and the Moondogs, Lennon, McCartney and Harrison reach the final audition stage of Carroll Levis's TV Star Search [a talent programme made by the ABC commercial TV company] at the Empire Theatre, Liverpool." However, it seems that it was the preliminary auditions that were held at the Liverpool Empire on three dates in October, and it was the regional final that was held on 15 November 1959 in Manchester. There are reports that the three young musicians, at this point working as guitarists without a drummer, could not afford lodgings for the night so they had to return to Liverpool before they could be called back to the stage for the final votes which were based on the level of audience applause.

"Manchester Hippodrome" ambiguities 
In some research materials there can be some confusion between the Hulme Hippodrome and the two versions of Manchester Hippodrome. Working with the theatre architect Frank Matcham, Oswald Stoll opened two new performance venues in Manchester in 1904: 

 Manchester Hippodrome (1904-1935) on Oxford Street. The site was subsequently the Gaumont cinema and Rotters night club, and currently is an NCP car park.
 Ardwick Empire (1904-1964) which was renamed the New Manchester Hippodrome Theatre when the 'old' one closed in 1935. It was at the junction of Higher Ardwick with Hyde Road, closed in 1961, demolished in 1964, and is currently a surface car park. After the 1930s reportedly it was used flexibly as both a cinema and for staged shows.

2020/23 – Contested ownership 
The property title is freehold with three named trustees as proprietors. GDM is an unincorporated body with a trust deed.    

In summary, the current ownership position is very probably that three named GDM property trustees named in the Land Registry are the registered title owners in trust, and a private individual property developer is the owner in equity. The property developer has added a Unilateral Notice to the registry title as a beneficial or equitable owner to emphasise this point.

Contract for sale 
Around 20 to 25 November 2020 a private individual who is a property developer and a disqualified director based in south London reportedly paid £450,000 to solicitors representing two persons claiming to be Gilbert Deya Ministries (GDM) charity trustees authorised to sell Hulme Hippodrome, by an exchange of a contract of sale or a purported contract of sale followed shortly by completion.     

One of these two people was a named trustee in the title deeds, the second person was not, and no evidence was presented to show the consent of the sale by the other two named trustees in the title deeds. A transcribed audio-recorded meeting on 29 January 2021 included one of the other named trustees in the title deeds stating their non-consent to the sale. The third named trustee is understood to have moved residence out of the UK some years ago.    

Whether this disposition (sale) was a breach of trust, or whether this was a misappropriation of trust property, or unjust enrichment, has not been decided by a court. Breach of trust can be a civil (damages) or a criminal matter (theft).

Attempted auction of the Hipp 
The property developer attempted to sell Hulme Hippodrome at an online auction on 10 February 2021, being advertised as potentially suitable for redevelopment into apartments (contrary to the Planning Act as a listed building) with a guide price of £950,000. Within days of discovering the auction notice, the campaign Save Hulme Hippodrome (SHH) was created by concerned people from the community with the goal of bringing Hulme Hippodrome into community ownership with the aim of restoring it as a community resource. The building was withdrawn from the auction following the first phase of campaigning, along with formal representations by the Theatres Trust and Manchester City Council.

Transfer of proprietorship refused by the Land Registry 
On 11 January 2021 in the post-completion phase of the conveyancing of the property, the developer's solicitors attempted to register the sale with a transfer of ownership details at the Land Registry (form TR1), which the Land Registrar declined to accept due to apparent irregularities both with the charity's lack of probity and governance (as sellers) and within a related TR1 attempted transfer (as buyers). The property developer had attempted a further onward transfer of ownership from themselves to a new company HHM20 Ltd on the same date (using a second TR1 form) with a stated value now at £600,000. (This second transfer cannot take effect until the first transfer has been accepted.) An appeal period was allowed by the Land Registry until 30 September 2021, and after considering some correspondence the decision by the Land Registry was confirmed - they rejected the first TR1 because the purported conveyance was void.   

On the same date the Charity Commission stated, "Despite the failure by the charity to comply with some of the statutory requirements, the sale was valid as a result of the saving provisions in the Charities Act 2011." (by email, 30 September 2021).

Charity Commission freezes Hipp sale funds (section 76) 
On 10 February 2021 the Charity Commission wrote to the conveyancing solicitors of GDM in order to freeze the money they were holding as clients funds from the sale of the Hipp. This was a section 76 order, and it stated that the frozen funds were £375,060-72p. With a reported sale price by solicitors to the Land Registry of £450,000 this suggests that around £75,000 had been withdrawn between November 2020 and February 2021, payments which have yet to be explained or audited.    

On 2 September 2021 the solicitors were further instructed by the Charity Commission to 'unfreeze' the funds and to pay the remaining amount directly to the Interim Managers appointed by the Charity Commission, not to the charity trustees (by a section 76 order).

Independent valuation 
In August 2021 the campaign group Save Hulme Hippodrome commissioned an independent RICS compliant valuation of the building which has been shared with the authorities.

Charity Commission tries to transfer the Hipp to property developer (section 69) 
On 12 October 2022 the Charity Commission issued a section 69 notice (Charities Act 2011) to the Land Registry seeking to remove any residual interest in the property by the charity and for a transfer of Hulme Hippodrome's ownership to the named private individual property developer.  

If the Charity Commission section 69 notice is implemented by the Land Registry it seems likely that the new ownership title will be possessory rather than absolute which can make any onward sale with a full title guarantee very difficult. An example of possessory title is where the applicant to the Land Registry has lost all their documents. An entry of ownership shown in the Land Register has the force of law, even if that entry has been added to the register by irregular or fraudulent means, and the Land Register is liable to pay damages from public funds to a defrauded party.

2021 – The Save Hulme Hippodrome campaign starts 
The SHH campaign started in January 2021 when the community became aware of the plans to sell the Hipp at an auction based in London, being advertised as suitable for apartments. The SHH campaign became a non-profit limited company in March 2021. The campaign's Facebook page has over 600 followers, there is regular use of social media and an Information Bulletin is produced for supporters and stakeholders. The activities include a heritage project with older supporters who recall visiting the Hipp as children in the 1950s, and extensive legal consultations and investigations.

Community engagement 
During 2021 the campaign held two community festivals with stalls, performances, and presentations of updates to supporters (18 July, 4 September). On 7 October 2021 an evening street party was held on Warwick Street to celebrate the building's 120th anniversary, including a projection of short films on the east wall. A Spring Festival was held by the campaign group on 6 March 2022. Further photographs were taken inside the building in 2021 by 'urban explorers'.

In the spring of 2022 a group of students in the MSA Live 2022 course event at the Manchester School of Architecture (MSA) hand-made a detailed 1:100 wooden scale model of Hulme Hippodrome and Playhouse, bisected to show the interior layout of the two auditoriums and the Floral Hall, along with digital images of various potential future uses. One suggestion by the MSA students was to consider adding a flattened dome across the entire roof space to better drain the volumes of rainwater from the complex roof form with its many galleys and channels. The model was the centrepiece of an exhibition (2022-2023) about the Hipp at Manchester Central Library.

Heritage uncovering and protection 
The campaign has run a heritage programme with three main projects: 

 Recording oral histories from current and former residents of Hulme who remember visiting the Hipp from the 1950s to the 2010s.
 Visiting the formal and informal archives of various organisations for their traces of the history of the Hipp.
 Desk and library research including images, books and newspapers.

External improvements asked for 
On 14 February 2022 Manchester City Council served a Section 215 improvements notice (Planning Act) on all the alleged owners for 11 types of external remedial works, which was appealed by one of the alleged owners at Manchester Magistrates Court on 29 July 2022 and the Notice was held in abeyance pending a full hearing on 12 January 2023. The appeal by the property developer was dismissed by the court, a variation of the improvements notice was agreed for 7 types of external remedial works, and the property developer had to pay the legal costs of the council.

In planning law these external improvements are not called "repairs" because a formal Repairs Notice served in the owner of a building can be much more wide-ranging, structural and detailed in scope and can be much more expensive to follow than external improvements to the look of a building. 

Filmed visual surveys of the roof by drones commissioned by the campaign in March 2021 and December 2022 have shown multiple holes in the roof, and the continuing deterioration with an estimated 23 holes and openings in the roof in the later inspection.

See also

Listed buildings in Manchester-M15

References

Theatres in Manchester
History of Manchester
Grade II listed buildings in Manchester
Former squats
Squats in the United Kingdom
1901 establishments in the United Kingdom